The list of ship launches in 1867 includes a chronological list of some ships launched in 1867.


References

Sources

1867
1867 in transport